Alex Holmes (born August 22, 1981 in San Diego, California) is a former National Football League tight end.

Professional career
Holmes played for the Miami Dolphins in 2005 and signed as a free agent with the St. Louis Rams for 2006.

College career
Holmes played college football for the University of Southern California. He was a starter at tight end, and a part of two national championship teams.

High school career
He played high school football for Harvard-Westlake School near Sherman Oaks, CA. In 1998, he led the team at tight end and middle linebacker to a 10-4 record, and a berth in the Division VII CIF Southern Section championship game. His coach called him the best player he had ever coached in his thirty-year career.

Personal
Holmes' father, Mike, played at the University of Michigan in the mid-1970s. Holmes' younger sister is married to Pittsburgh Steelers safety Troy Polamalu. His younger brother Khaled was an offensive lineman at USC, and currently plays for the Indianapolis Colts. Known for repeatedly torching unsuspecting defenders, he continues playing in some of Southern California's premier basketball leagues.

References

External links
 TSN Bio

1981 births
Living people
American football tight ends
USC Trojans football players
Miami Dolphins players
Players of American football from San Diego
American people of Greek descent
Harvard-Westlake School alumni